Gekko kaengkrachanense, the Kaeng Krachan parachute gecko or Kaeng Krachan flying gecko, is a species of geckos endemic to Thailand. The kaengkrachanense epithet is a reference to Kaeng Krachan National Park and Kaeng Krachan District in Phetchaburi Province of Thailand. It is only known from the Kaeng Krachan National Park, but is likely to occur more widely, including adjacent Myanmar.

References

Gekko
Lizards of Asia
Geckos of Thailand
Endemic fauna of Thailand
Reptiles described in 2012
Taxa named by Kirati Kunya